Faezeh Shahriari (born October 28, 1994) is an Iranian basketball player. She plays in the shooting guard position and she is bronze medal  holder of the 2019 FISU in China.

Biography 
Faezeh Shahriari started playing basketball at the age of 11 with the encouragement of her mother and under the supervision of Sepideh Khoshgadam. At the age of 13,  she joined the Rah'ahan Premier League team and a year later at the age of 14 she joined the national youth team. Shahriari has played for the Rah'ahan, Koosha Sepehr Sabalan, Nader Shimi Qom, Naft abadan and Chimidor Qom clubs. Also, her younger brother Ali Shahriari is a member of the Iranian national youth basketball team and one of the good players of the Mahram Tehran team.

Achievements

See also
 Iranian Women's Basketball League 2015 
 Iranian Women's Basketball League 2016 
 Iranian Women's Basketball League 2019 
 International University Sports Federation
 Iran women's national basketball team
 Islamic Republic of Iran Basketball Federation
 Iranian Basketball Super League

References

External links 
 Faezeh Shahriari at Basketballasia.com
 
 Faezeh Shahriari official website

1994 births
Living people
Centers (basketball)
People from Tehran
Iranian women's basketball players